There are over 20,000 Grade II* listed buildings in England. This page is a list of these buildings in the district of Tewkesbury in Gloucestershire.

Tewkesbury

|}

Notes

External links

 
Grade II*
Grade II*